Burette clamp is a scientific equipment which used specifically to hold and secure a burette on a stand, so that a burette is fixed and more convenient for the experiment.  Burette clamps can be made with many materials such as plastic and cast iron. However, an iron clamp with a rubber knob to hold the burette are usually more durable. Usually burette clamps come in doubles, which means they can hold two burettes.

Burettes can be held by varying methods, some including the ones suggested below. To use a burette clamp, you should fix the burette clamp on a stand, squeeze the handle, and the rubber knobs will separate from each other. The burette will then be put between the rubber knobs. The rubber knobs are typically soft and sticky due to properties of rubber, so the burettes are not likely to break or slip during the experiment.

See also 
 Retort stand
 Utility clamp
 Burette

References 

Laboratory equipment